Jared Farmer (born 1974) is the Walter H. Annenberg Professor of History at the University of Pennsylvania. He specializes in environmental history, landscape studies, and the North American West.

Biography 

Jared Farmer gained his BA from Utah State University in 1996, and his MA from the University of Montana in 1999. He earned his PhD at Stanford University in 2005.

From 2005, he was a Postdoctoral Fellow at the University of Southern California. In 2007, he joined the history faculty at Stony Brook University. In 2020 he moved to the University of Pennsylvania, where he is the Walter H. Annenberg Professor of History.

Awards and distinctions 

Farmer's book On Zion's Mount won the 2009 Francis Parkman Prize from the Society of American Historians. His book Trees in Paradise won the 2015 Ray Allen Billington Prize from the Organization of American Historians. In 2014 Farmer received the Hiett Prize the Humanities from the Dallas Institute. In 2017 he was named an Andrew Carnegie Fellow by the Carnegie Corporation of New York. In 2018 the American Academy in Berlin awarded him a Berlin Prize.

Bibliography

References

External links 

 Jared Farmer's website.
 Jared Farmer's university profile.

1974 births
Living people
University of Pennsylvania faculty
American historians
Environmental historians
Historians of the American West